Vesicle-associated membrane protein-associated protein B/C is a protein that in humans is encoded by the VAPB gene.  The VAPB gene is found on the 20th human chromosome. Together with VAPA, it forms the VAP protein family.

Function 

The protein encoded by this gene is a type IV membrane protein found in plasma and intracellular vesicle membranes. The encoded protein is found as a homodimer and as a heterodimer with VAPA. This protein also can interact with VAMP1 and VAMP2 and may be involved in vesicle trafficking.

Like VAPA, VAPB binds to proteins that contain a FFAT motif. Considerable interest in VAPB has arisen because mutations in this protein are associated with rare, familial forms of motor neuron disease (also called amyotrophic lateral sclerosis and Lou Gehrig's disease).

References

Further reading